The 2012–13 Florida Gators women's basketball team represented the University of Florida in the sport of basketball during the 2012–13 women's college basketball season.  The Gators competed in Division I of the National Collegiate Athletic Association (NCAA) and the Southeastern Conference (SEC).  They were led by head coach Amanda Butler, and played their home games in the O'Connell Center on the university's Gainesville, Florida campus.

The Gators advanced to the Women's National Invitation Tournament, where they lost to the Drexel Dragons in the semifinal round.

Previous season
In the 2011–12 season, the Gators finished with a record of 20–13 overall, 8–8 in the SEC, and lost in the 2nd Round of the NCAA tournament to Baylor.

Schedule and results

|-
!colspan=12| Regular season (Non-conference play)

|-
!colspan=12| Regular season (Conference play)

|-
!colspan=12| SEC tournament

|-

|-
!colspan=12| National Invitational Tournament

|-
| colspan="12" | *Non-Conference Game. Rankings from AP poll. All times are in Eastern Time.  Tournament seedings in parenthesis.  
|}

Source:

References

External links
Official Site

Florida Gators women's basketball seasons
Florida
Florida Gators women's basketball team
Florida Gators women's basketball team
2013 Women's National Invitation Tournament participants